The Texas brown snake (Storeria dekayi texana), a subspecies of Storeria dekayi, is a nonvenomous snake in the family Colubridae. It is endemic to North America.

Geographic range
It is found from southern Minnesota to eastern Texas and northeastern Mexico.

Description
Adults and young have reddish brown colored bodies with dark brown spots around the eyes. These occipital blotches are wider than in other subspecies of S. dekayi, and the fourth upper labial is usually darkened to a greater extent. S. d. texana also differs from the other subspecies by not having the anterior temporal shield marked with a black vertical bar or horizontal stripe. Adults average  in total length, but may reach .

Habitat
They can be found in moist woodlands under logs and bark. In urban areas they are often found in gardens and flower beds, and also under old pieces of roofing or linoleum in backyards and vacant lots.

Diet
They feed primarily on slugs and earthworms, but also eat insects, spiders, and cricket frogs (genus Acris).

Reproduction
Storeria dekayi texana is ovoviviparous. Females bear live young in August and early September. Each young emerges in a fine tissue sac, which after bursting remains attached to the ventrum, but is quickly shed. Brood size varies from 3 to 15. The newborns measure   in total length.

References

Further reading
Trapido, Harold. 1944. The snakes of the genus Storeria. American Midland Naturalist 31 (1): 1-84.

External links 
 Description from Houston Herpetological Supply
 Description from Iowa Herpetology Network
 Bloggess Blog Post with Snake Photos

Storeria
Fauna of the Plains-Midwest (United States)
Reptiles described in 1944
Reptiles of the United States
Reptiles of Mexico